Agter Elke Man is a television drama series which premiered on 5 September 1985 on the SABC's TV1 and concluded on 10 November 1988. The series focuses on the lives of the women behind a number of successful men. Two series were aired, and the second series was followed by a movie, titled Agter Elke Man, which was released on 28 September 1990.

Characters

Main characters
Marietjie Barnhoorn (Christine Basson)
Andries Barnhoorn (Andre Verster)
Wessel Barnhoorn (Glen Bosman)
Mercia Meyer (Rika Sennett)
Anna Meyer (Anna Richter-Visser)
Leana Steyn / Jooste / Beyers (Cyrilene Slabbert)
Stienie Steyn (Dulsie van den Bergh)
Doreen van Langhans (Kim de Beer)
Sarie van Langhans (Annelize van der Ryst)
Steve Anderson (Deon van Zyl)
Kobus Dreyer (Franz Marx)
Hettie (Hannah Botha)
Herman Celliers (Eghard van der Hoven)
Suzie Bruwer (Sulette Thompson)
Bruce Beyers (Steve Hofmeyr)
Annette Malan (Elizabeth Archer)
Johan Malan (Andreas Jordaan)
Tersia Hofmeyer (Riana Wilkens)
Willie Snyders (Richard van der Westhuizen)

Recurring characters
Wynand Toerien (Deon Coetzee)
Annemarie Barnhoorn (Almarene Visser)
Albert Jooste (Pierre de Wet)
Mev. Simpson (Magda van Biljon)
Mnr. Vlok (Louis van Niekerk)
Mev. Duvenhage (Hermien Dommisse)
Hannes Sierberhagen (Johan Malherbe)
Elzetta (Dot Feldman)
Mnr Myburg
Tannie Barkhuizen (Naomie van Niekerk)
Tallulah, Steve's Secretary (Alida Theron)
Mnr. van Breda (Michal Grobbelaar)
Boet Bryce, Bruce's Father (Carel Trichardt)
Bryce Mother (Petru Wessels)
William Beyers, Bruce's brother (Johan Scholtz)
Santie Beyers, William's wife (Liesl van den Berg)
Willie Smit (Willie Jansen)
Hans van Langhans (Dirk Graceland)
Jack Steyn (Scot Scott)
Weltehagen (At Botha)
Tannie Piet (Tilana Hanekom)
Koot Hofmeyer (Pieter de Bruyn)

Episodes

See also 
 List of South African television series

References

External links

Cera Video

South African drama television series
South African Broadcasting Corporation television shows
Television shows set in South Africa